A list of universities in Namibia.

There are three institutions in Namibia considered universities:
 Namibia University of Science and Technology (NUST, formerly the Polytechnic of Namibia, PoN) - Windhoek
 University of Namibia (UNAM) - Windhoek
 Windhoek College of Education, Khomasdal, Windhoek
 Caprivi College of Education, Katima Mulilo
 Rundu College of Education, Rundu
 Ongwediva College of Education, Ongwediva
 International University of Management (IUM), Windhoek

The four Colleges of Education are since 2010 part of the University of Namibia; They provide teacher education. The Polytechnic of Namibia was de jure not a university as no provision was made in the Act by which it was created (Act 33 / 1994) to carry this name. A motion for name change into Namibia's University of Science and Technology was rejected by cabinet in August 2010, but approved by the same body in December 2012. The transition to university happened in subsequent years.

Vocational training institutions
Most of the vocational training in Namibia is delivered by Vocational Training Centres (VTCs) controlled by the Namibian Training Authority (NTA). There are seven VTCs in Namibia:
 Eenhana Vocational Training Centre, Engela, Ohangwena Region
 Nakayale Vocational Training Centre, Outapi, Omusati Region
 Okakarara Vocational Training Centre, Okakarara, Otjozondjupa Region. The OVTC has 50 staff and about 600 students.
 Rundu Vocational Training Centre, Rundu, Kavango West
 Valombola Vocational Training Centre, Ongwediva, Oshana Region
 Windhoek Vocational Training Centre, Windhoek, Khomas Region
 Zambezi Vocational Training Centre, Katima Mulilo, Zambezi Region
 Ngato Vocational Training Center, Rundu, Kavango West

There are few other vocational training institutions in Namibia. Some of the artisan training is done by the Namibia University of Science and Technology.
 Namibia Institute of Mining and Technology (NIMT) in Arandis trains professions such as boilermakers, electricians, fitters and diesel mechanics. It is funded by De Beers and subsidized by the Namibian Government.
 Namibian Maritime and Fisheries Institute (Namfi) in Walvis Bay, founded in 1996, provides vocational training for maritime industries.
 Institute for Domestic Science & Agriculture in Baumgartsbrunn, established in 1991, is an institution not accredited by the Namibia Qualifications Authority. It provides training for domestic workers.
 Welwitchia Health Training Centre, established 2013, trains nurses, healthcare and social workers, and medical administrative staff. Headquartered in Windhoek, campuses in Kombat, Nkurenkuru, Katima Mulilo and Walvis Bay.
 I-Care Health Training Institute, established 2017, trains nurses and healthcare workers. Campuses are in Windhoek, Swakopmund and Oniipa.

See also
 Education in Namibia
 List of schools in Namibia

References

Universities
Universities in Namibia
Namibia
Namibia